Papilio prexaspes, the blue Helen, is a swallowtail butterfly found in Southeast Asia. The race found in the Andaman and Nicobar Islands, Papilio prexaspes andamanicus (earlier placed under Papilio fuscus), is also known as the Andaman Helen.

Description

The taxonomic description below is of race prexaspes and is taken from Charles Thomas Bingham's 1907 book (in the public domain):

Closely resembles Papilio chaon, from which it differs as follows: smaller; fore wing more produced, its termen concave. 
Male has the ground colour of the upperside of the wings a more brownish sooty-black. Hind wing with the upper discal white patch extended into interspace 4, most usually very slightly so, often represented only by a very small spot of white scaling, a white spot also above the tornal angle. Underside, fore wing: the internervular brownish-yellow streaks limited to the apical area of the wing. Hind wing: the upper discal patch extended to the dorsum in a series of three pure white not ochraceous-tinted spots, a more or less incomplete postdiscal series of lunules formed of diffuse blue scales, and the subterminal series of ochraceous lunules of a darker colour and smaller than in chaon; the rest as in chaon.

The upperside of the wing in females has the ground-colour paler than in chaon. Fore wing with an ill-defined broad pale discal band perceptibly widened and becoming whitish opposite apex of cell. Hind wing: the extension into interspace 4 of the upper discal white patch more pronounced than in the male, the small white spot above the tornal angle followed in some specimens by a blue ill-defined lunule and an ochraceous spot. Underside, fore wing: the transverse discal hand white and much more prominent than on the upperside. Hind wing: the postdiscal series of blue lunules generally complete and well-marked: the rest as in the male.

Taxonomy
Papilio prexaspes is a member of the fuscus species group. The members of this clade are:
 Papilio albinus Wallace, 1865
 Papilio diophantus Grose-Smith, 1883
 Papilio fuscus Goeze, 1779
 Papilio hipponous C. & R. Felder, 1862
 Papilio jordani Fruhstorfer, 1906
 Papilio pitmani Elwes & de Nicéville, [1887]
 Papilio prexaspes C. & R. Felder, 1865
 Papilio sakontala Hewitson, 1864

See also
Papilionidae
List of butterflies of India
List of butterflies of India (Papilionidae)

References

Other reading
 
 http://www.bbec.sabah.gov.my/overall/bbec24/TWENTYFOUR.pdf

External links
 http://yutaka.it-n.jp/pap/10410010.html
 https://web.archive.org/web/20091028145941/http://geocities.com/RainForest/Vines/2382/papilionidae/bluhelen.htm

prexaspes
Butterflies of Indochina
Butterflies of Asia
Butterflies of Malaysia
Butterflies of Singapore
Lepidoptera of Thailand
Insects of Myanmar
Insects of Vietnam
Butterflies described in 1779